The Mitsubishi K7M (or Mitsubishi Ka-18) was a 1930s Japanese experimental crew trainer built by Mitsubishi for the Imperial Japanese Navy to replace the K3M.

Design and development
The K7M was a cantilever high-wing monoplane with a cabin for five students and two instructors, and was of metal construction, with fabric-covered outer wings. The K7M was powered by two 340 hp (254 kW) Gasuden Tempu radial piston engines. The Navy decided the twin-engined type was too costly to replace the single-engined K3M and the type was not developed further, the two prototypes did enter service as trainers with the designation K7M1.

Operators

 Imperial Japanese Navy Air Service

Specifications

See also

References

Notes

Bibliography

1930s Japanese military trainer aircraft
K7M